Jeff Muendel is an author, Hammond organist/keyboardist, and electric guitarist who has written several novels and played with bands including Rattlebone, Backbiter, Circus of Power, Masters of Reality, The Silos, Hum Machine, and Instead We Smile.

Early life and education
Muendel grew up in Milwaukee, Wisconsin.

Music career
Muendel began playing in cover bands at age 18. In 1991, he moved to Hollywood, California, and he began playing music with neighbor and bass player Roger Deering. Deering had previously been in a Florida punk band called The Drills. He and drummer Kerry Furlong had moved from Miami to Los Angeles to start a new band. The three musicians added Brendon McNichol on guitar and the band was established.

The Drills

The early shows were performed under the old name, The Drills, because of the reputation they had developed with that name, including one album release. The group was "discovered" by producer Dave Jerden, who is also credited with discovering and developing Jane's Addiction, Alice in Chains, and The Offspring.

Rattlebone

The group was signed to Hollywood Records, and at the label's request, the group changed its name to Rattlebone. With Jerden at the helm, they released a 5-song EP in 1992 and recorder a full-length LP in 1993/94 that was never released. McNichol left Rattlebone in 1995 when the record label dropped the band in response to the grunge movement. The remaining group split in 1996.

Backbiter

Muendel went on to briefly join a version of Circus of Power and then spent three years in the L.A. punk group Backbiter. He played on one release by Man's Ruin Records.

The Motor Primitives

From 2006 - 2009, Muendel played organ and guitar in The Motor Primitives, a band based in Madison, Wisconsin featuring former members of Tar Babies and The Appliances SFB.

Instead We Smile

Since 2014, Muendel has been the guitarist in Instead We Smile, a hard rock band based in Madison, Wisconsin with Ed Feeny of The Appliances SFB.

Writing
In 1998, Muendel left California to attend graduate school on the East Coast. He has published two novels set in the world of rock and roll including  The Volume Tribes. His books often deal with themes within the world of rock music, and his work is often categorized as "Rock Lit". He is also an editor for Maximum Ink Magazine and continues to compose, play and record as an organist and guitarist.

Year of birth missing (living people)
Living people
21st-century American novelists
American male novelists
American heavy metal keyboardists
21st-century American male writers
21st-century American keyboardists
The Silos members